Sheena is an American action-adventure television series which was produced for first-run syndication from 2000 to 2002.

Based upon W. Morgan Thomas's comic book character Sheena, Queen of the Jungle, which previously spawned a 1950s TV series of the same title; this turn-of-the-millennium version updated its title character to the 21st century. There were two seasons, containing 22 and 13 episodes. It starred Gena Lee Nolin and John Allen Nelson, and was developed for television by Douglas Schwartz and Steven L. Sears. In this version, Sheena was given the mystical ability to transform into almost any jungle animal; she also spoke whole sentences (akin to Ron Ely's Tarzan), unlike Irish McCalla's interpretation of the character. Several episodes from the first season are available to view for free in Minisode format on Crackle, as well as on Hulu.

Premise
Sheena's parents were archaeologists who died in the jungle when she was about six years old, orphaning their daughter Cheryl Hamilton (as explained in the episode "Stranded in the Jungle"; otherwise, Sheena remembers nothing of her parents, or of her pre-Africa childhood). She was taken in by Kali, a local Shamaness of a tribe who brought her up; five years ago, she was taught how to morph into birds and other animals, thus acquiring their abilities, up to and including flight. She also befriended animals such as zebra Marika, elephant Chango and monkey Tiki. Moreover, she became a mythical creature called "The Darak'na" who relies on people's fear of the unknown. For this, she covers herself in a dark liquid mud which allows her to be largely unseen in the low light of the jungle. With above-average strength, agility and speed—and armed with a pair of bone-clawed gloves—she is a formidable one-woman fighting force. She does kill sometimes.

In the first episode, she meets Matt Cutter (John Allen Nelson) who runs a safari business by air, water and land. In his youth, Cutter had a promising career as a football player till a knee injury ruined it (he has no apparent injury now). He joined the CIA, being code-named "Jericho" and fought as a mercenary. He was a first class sniper but an accident meant he killed an innocent person which caused him to abandon his old life for the life he now leads.

On their first meeting, Sheena is not sure what side Cutter is on, as she is a protector of the jungle and Cutter seems willing to do anything for money. He is unknowingly helping criminals. Within several episode, Cutter became more responsible, and less booze- and money-oriented. Sometimes there is chemistry between Sheena and Cutter, hinting at a development of their relationship, and at other times, the plotline appears to show a platonic friendship. This is notable in an episode where she meets an old "Agency" friend of Cutter's and a deeper level intimacy is suggested than in any of the scenes with Cutter.

Mendelsohn is a run-down buddy of Cutter's who services his plane and does odd jobs for him. The three come up against the local petty tyrant, would be dictators, small armies, a police officer who cannot wholly be trusted, evil tribesmen, evil foreigners, people from their past, assorted traps, etc.

Episodes

Season 1 (2000–01)

Season 2 (2001–02)

Home media
Sony Pictures Home Entertainment released both seasons on DVD in Region 1 in 2012.  Season 1 was released on June 5, 2012, while season 2 was released on July 3, 2012.  These are Manufacture-on-Demand (MOD) releases.

On August 15, 2017, Mill Creek Entertainment re-released the complete series on DVD in Region 1 in a 6-disc set entitled Sheena - Queen of the Jungle Collection: The Movie & TV Series.

See also
Animorphs, a TV series adaptation of the book series of the same name
Manimal

References

External links
 
 

Television series by Sony Pictures Television
2000 American television series debuts
2002 American television series endings
Television shows based on comics
First-run syndicated television programs in the United States
English-language television shows
Television shows set in Africa
Television shows filmed in Florida
Television series about shapeshifting
Jungle girls
American action television series
American adventure television series
American fantasy television series
American action adventure television series